Jack Coleman (born April 14, 1993) is an American soccer player who last played for the Carolina RailHawks in the NASL.  After attending Indiana University for his freshman year, Coleman transferred to the ACC to play and earn a Bachelor of Arts degree in Sociology at Duke University.  He is a former academy player at FC Dallas of Major League Soccer.  Coleman was also a member of the U-14, U-15, and U-18 US National teams during his youth.

External links
 Carolina RailHawks bio 

1993 births
Living people
American soccer players
Indiana Hoosiers men's soccer players
Duke Blue Devils men's soccer players
North Carolina FC players
Association football defenders
Soccer players from Oklahoma
Sportspeople from Norman, Oklahoma
North American Soccer League players
United States men's youth international soccer players